Sir William Frederick Lloyd   (December 17, 1864 – June 13, 1937) was a newspaper editor and  Prime Minister of Newfoundland from 1918 to 1919.

Born in Stockport, England, Lloyd emigrated to Newfoundland in 1890 where he taught school before becoming a journalist and becoming editor of The Telegram. He was first elected to the Newfoundland House of Assembly in 1904 as a Liberal and became Leader of the opposition in 1916.

Due to a political crisis over conscription the government of Sir Edward Patrick Morris formed a National Government and invited Lloyd to join as Attorney-General. After Morris retired at the end of 1917, the governor asked Lloyd to form a government even though he was from a minority party. Lloyd took over the National Government but in 1919 his minister of finance, Sir Michael Patrick Cashin, who had succeeded Morris as leader of the Newfoundland People's Party moved a motion of no confidence and defeated the Lloyd government. Cashin became the new Prime Minister and Lloyd returned to the opposition benches.

Lloyd served again in government, briefly, as minister of justice in 1924.

In the 1919 New Year Honours, he was named Knight Commander of the Order of St Michael and St George.

He married Agnes Taylor in 1896; the couple had one son.

William F. Lloyd died in St. John's on June 13, 1937.

References 

 

1864 births
1937 deaths
Prime Ministers of the Dominion of Newfoundland
Members of the Newfoundland and Labrador House of Assembly
People from Stockport
Knights Commander of the Order of St Michael and St George
Newfoundland Colony people
Attorneys-General of the Dominion of Newfoundland
Canadian members of the Privy Council of the United Kingdom